Madre is a 2016 Colombian short drama film directed by Simón Mesa Soto. It is one of four short films created as part of a Swedish-financed international film project titled "Break the Silence" which examines sexualized violence against children. It premiered at the 2016 Cannes Film Festival as one of the entries in the Short Film Palme d'Or competition. Later that year it won the prize of Best Fiction Short Film at Havana Film Festival, it was a nominee for Best Short Film at Dokufest, it won a Gold Hugo at Chicago Film Festival, it was nominated  for Live Action Short Film at AFI Fest and it was nominated for Best Fiction Short Film at Guanajuato International Film Festival. 2017 was a successful year too for the film since it won the awards Best Fiction Short Film and Best Actress at Bogotá Film Festival and was nominated for Best Short Film at Premios Macondo.

Synopsis
16-year-old Andrea leaves her neighborhood in the hills of Medellin to attend a downtown casting call for a porno film.

Cast
 Yurani Anduquia Cortes
 Paulo De Jesús Barros Sousa
 María Camila Maldonado

See also
 Short Film Palme d'Or

References

External links

2016 films
2010s Spanish-language films
2016 drama films
2016 short films
Short Film Palme d'Or winners
Colombian short films
Colombian drama films
Swedish drama films
Swedish short films
2010s Swedish films
2010s Colombian films